Gregory J. Wilson (born c. 1971/72) is an American soccer head coach and former professional player.  He is currently the associate head coach with the UC Santa Barbara Gauchos men's soccer team.

Early life and education 
Wilson was a native of Downingtown, Pennsylvania and attended Downingtown High School.  He was a member of the state championship soccer team in 1989 and was named as a National Soccer Coaches Association of America All-American player prior to the conclusion of his high school career.

Wilson attended college at Philadelphia College of Textiles & Science and was a student-athlete on the men's soccer team from 1990 to 1993.  He graduated with a Bachelor of Science in Marketing in 1994.

Playing career 
Wilson played professionally with the Pennsylvania Freedom in the USISL for three years.  At 22, he was one of the youngest players on the Freedom for the 1994 United States Interregional Soccer League season.

Coaching career 
After playing professionally, Wilson coached a number of youth teams based in the Pennsylvania area including FC Delco and Downingtown High School, the latter with whom he won back-to-back Pennsylvania Interscholastic Athletic Association in 1998 and 1999.  He was named the 1998 The Philadelphia Inquirer Coach of the Year.  He also served on staff for the Penn Quakers in 2002.

Wilson was named head coach of his alma mater, since renamed as Philadelphia University, prior to the 2003 season.  His first game with the Rams was September 2, 2003.

After three seasons with the Rams, it was announced in March 2006 that Wilson would join the UC Santa Barbara Gauchos men's soccer team as an assistant coach.  Prior to the 2015 season, Wilson was elevated to an associate head coach position with the Gauchos.

References

External links 
 UC Santa Barbara coaching profile
 Philadelphia University coaching profile

Living people
American soccer players
Soccer players from Pennsylvania
Association football forwards
Philadelphia Rams soccer players
USISL players
UC Santa Barbara Gauchos men's soccer coaches
Place of birth missing (living people)
People from Downingtown, Pennsylvania
Sportspeople from Chester County, Pennsylvania
American soccer coaches
Year of birth missing (living people)